Solanum latiflorum is a species of plant in the family Solanaceae. It is endemic to Brazil.

References

Flora of Brazil
latiflorum
Near threatened plants
Taxonomy articles created by Polbot